Fritz Heinemann may refer to:

Fritz Heinemann (artist) (1864–1932), German sculptor
Fritz Heinemann (philosopher) (1889–1970), German philosopher